Income-based repayment or income-driven-repayment (IDR) is a student loan repayment program in the United States that regulates the amount that one needs to pay each month based on one's current income and family size.

The phrase is an umbrella term for four specific repayment plans that are available within the William D. Ford Federal Direct Loan Program (FDLP, FDSLP, and Direct Loan) and the Federal Family Education Loan Program (FFEL). All these four repayment plans are also named as Income-Based Repayment (IBR), Pay As You Earn (PAYE), Revised Pay As You Earn (REPAYE), and Income-Contingent Repayment (ICR).

Mechanics
Payments under the IBR Plan are 10% or 15% of discretionary income but never exceed the 10-year standard repayment amount. 

Whether a borrower pays 10% or 15% of discretionary income depends on when the borrower first started borrowing student loans.

 10% of the borrower's discretionary income if they borrowed on or after July 1, 2014
 15% of the borrower's discretionary income if they did not borrow on or after July 1, 2014

Payments under the PAYE Plan are 10% of discretionary income but will never be more than the 10-year standard repayment amount.

Payments under the REPAYE Plan are also 10% of discretionary income; however, unlike IBR and PAYE, payments for high-income borrowers may be higher than the 10-year standard repayment amount. Also, unlike IBR and PAYE, if required monthly payments do not cover the accruing interest, 50% of the unpaid interest is forgiven, thereby reducing negative amortization.

Payments under the ICR Plan are the lesser of 20% of discretionary income or a 12-year standard repayment amount adjusted based on the borrower's income.

Eligibility
Eligibility requirements for the income-driven repayment plans depend on which plan the borrower chooses and when the student borrowed.

 The ICR Plan has the fewest eligibility requirements. A borrower is only required to have an eligible loan.
 The IBR and Pay As You Earn Plans require that the borrower demonstrate a "need" to make income-driven payments and have eligible loans.
 The Pay As You Earn Plan is limited to those who borrowed recently. Specifically, the borrower must be a "new borrower" as of October 1, 2007, and have received a disbursement of a Direct Loan on or after October 1, 2011. A borrower is a "new borrower" if, when receiving a federal student loan on or after October 1 2007, the borrower did not have an outstanding balance on another federal student loan.
 The Revised Pay As You Earn Plan is available to all Direct Loan borrowers regardless of when the money was borrowed. FFEL loans can be made eligible if they are consolidated into a Direct Consolidation Loan.

Eligible loans
Eligible loans for the ICR Plan are all loans made under the William D. Ford Federal Direct Loan Program except Parent PLUS Loans. However, if a Parent PLUS Loan is consolidated into a Direct Consolidation Loan, then the Direct Consolidation Loan may be repaid under the ICR Plan.

Eligible loans for the IBR Plan are all loans made under the Ford Program and Federal Family Education Loan Program except for Parent PLUS Loans. Unlike ICR, Parent PLUS Loans cannot be consolidated into a consolidation loan to qualify.

Eligible loans for the PAYE Plan are all loans made under the Ford Program except for Parent PLUS Loans. Unlike ICR, Parent PLUS Loans cannot be consolidated into a consolidation loan to qualify.

Borrowers with Federal Family Education Loan (FFEL) Program loans and Federal Perkins Loan Program loans may become eligible for the ICR, Pay As You Earn, and Revised Pay As You Earn plans by consolidating them into a Direct Consolidation Loan.

Different terms and conditions
The IBR and PAYE Plans require that borrowers demonstrate a "need" to make income-driven payments. This debt-to-income test checks to see whether the borrower would see a payment amount reduction under the IBR or PAYE Plan relative to the 10-year standard repayment plan.

The IBR Plan has different terms and conditions depending on when the student borrowed. If the borrower is a "new borrower" on or after July 1, 2014, then the borrower will have payments that are generally 10% of discretionary income, and forgiveness is provided for after 20 years of qualifying payment. If a borrower is not a new borrower on or after July 1, 2014, then payments will generally be 15% of discretionary income, and forgiveness is provided for after 25 years of qualifying repayment.

Similar to the definition of "new borrower" for Pay As You Earn, a new borrower for the IBR Plan is one who, when receiving a federal student loan on or after July 1, 2014, the borrower did not have an outstanding balance on another federal student loan.

Determining eligibility
Utilizing the repayment estimator online, a borrower may estimate their other monthly payments under all repayment plans, including IBR. However, repayment estimator can only estimate eligibility. To determine that they are eligible, the borrower must contact their loan servicer. The National Student Loan Data System lets a borrower know who is the servicer of their loan.

Public Service Loan Forgiveness Program
The Public Service Loan Forgiveness Program provides for the forgiveness of certain types of federal student loans after 10 years of qualifying employment and payments. The IBR plan can qualify for the Public Service Loan Forgiveness Program. To receive Public Service Loan Forgiveness, the borrower must repay their loans under one of the "income-driven repayment plans," including IBR.

Applying for an income-driven repayment plan
To apply for an income-driven repayment plan, a borrower needs to submit the Income-Driven Repayment Plan Request and provide information about family size and income.

Tax information, as well as the application itself, and certification of family size, may be provided electronically through StudentLoans.gov. If completing the application electronically, a borrower may transfer tax information into the application directly from the Internal Revenue Service (IRS).

According to the application, borrowers may also self-certify if they currently have no income, thus avoiding needing to try and document that they have no income.

Because the eligibility criteria are complex, the application allows borrowers to indicate that they want their loan servicer to determine which of the income-driven plans the borrower is eligible for, and to place the borrower on the income-driven plan with the lowest monthly payment amount.

Recent announcements
On June 9, 2014, President Obama announced that the Department of Education would modify the PAYE Plan so that it is available to all borrowers, regardless of when they borrowed. The new repayment plan, Revised Pay As You Earn, launched on December 17, 2015.

The U.S. Department of Education Office of Inspector General recently calculated that the portion of total Direct Loan volume being repaid through IDR plans has increased 625 percent from the FY 2011 loan cohort ($7.1 billion) to the FY 2015 loan cohort ($51.5 billion). For IDR plans, the Federal government is expected to lend more money than borrowers repay. From the FY 2011 through FY 2015 loan cohorts, the total positive subsidy cost (net cash outflow) for student loans being repaid through IDR plans has increased 748 percent%(from $1.4 billion to $11.5 billion)

References

External links
Student Aid
Student Loans
repayment estimator online
The National Student Loan Data System (nslds.ed.gov)

 Student financial aid